Arthur Henderson (13 September 1863 – 20 October 1935) was a British iron moulder and Labour politician. He was the first Labour cabinet minister, won the Nobel Peace Prize in 1934 and, uniquely, served three separate terms as Leader of the Labour Party in three different decades. He was popular among his colleagues, who called him "Uncle Arthur" in acknowledgement of his integrity, his devotion to the cause and his imperturbability. He was a transitional figure whose policies were, at first, close to those of the Liberal Party. The trades unions rejected his emphasis on arbitration and conciliation, and thwarted his goal of unifying the Labour Party and the trade unions.

Early life 
Arthur Henderson was born at 10 Paterson Street, Anderston, Glasgow, Scotland, in 1863, the son of Agnes, a domestic servant, and David Henderson, a textile worker who died when Arthur was ten years old. After his father's death, the Hendersons moved to Newcastle upon Tyne in the North-East of England, where Agnes later married Robert Heath.

Henderson worked at Robert Stephenson and Sons' General Foundry Works from the age of twelve. After finishing his apprenticeship there aged seventeen, he moved to Southampton for a year and then returned to work as an iron moulder (a type of foundryman) in Newcastle upon Tyne.

Henderson became a Methodist in 1879 (having previously been a Congregationalist) and became a Local Preacher. After he lost his job in 1884, he concentrated on preaching.

Union leader 
In 1892, Henderson entered the complex world of trade union politics when he was elected as a paid organiser for the Friendly Society of Iron Founders. He also became a representative on the North East Conciliation Board. Henderson believed that strikes caused more harm than they were worth and tried to avoid them whenever he could. For this reason, he opposed the formation of the General Federation of Trade Unions, as he was convinced that it would lead to more strikes.

The Labour Party 

In 1900 Henderson was one of the 129 trade union and socialist delegates who passed Keir Hardie's motion to create the Labour Representation Committee (LRC). In 1903, Henderson was elected Treasurer of the LRC and was also elected as Member of Parliament (MP) for Barnard Castle at a by-election. From 1903 to 1904, Henderson also served as mayor of Darlington, County Durham.

In 1906, the LRC changed its name to the Labour Party and won 29 seats at the general election. In 1908, when Hardie resigned as Leader of the Labour Party, Henderson was elected to replace him. He remained Leader until his own resignation two years later, in 1910.

Cabinet Minister 
In 1914 the First World War broke out and Ramsay MacDonald resigned from the Leadership of the Labour Party in protest. Henderson was elected to replace him.  The two became enemies.

In 1915, following Prime Minister H. H. Asquith's decision to create a coalition government, Henderson became the first member of the Labour Party to become a member of the Cabinet, as President of the Board of Education.

In 1916, David Lloyd George forced Asquith to resign and replaced him as Prime Minister. Henderson became a member of the small War Cabinet with the post of Minister without Portfolio on 9 December 1916. The other Labour representatives who joined Henderson in Lloyd George's coalition government were John Hodge, who became Minister of Labour, and George Barnes, who became Minister of Pensions. Henderson resigned on 11 August 1917 after his proposal for an international conference on the war was rejected by the rest of the Cabinet.<ref>Eric Hopkins, 'A Social History of the English Working Classes, 1815–1945 (Hodder & Stoughton, 1979) p. 219. .</ref> The Labour National Executive Committee had rejected the Second International's request for a meeting of European socialist parties on the war in Stockholm, but after Henderson convinced it to give provisional support after visiting the Russian Republic as an envoy and recognizing that the Russian Provisional Government would collapse if the war continued.

Henderson turned his attention to building a strong constituency-based support network for the Labour Party. Previously, it had little national organisation, based largely on branches of unions and socialist societies. Working with Ramsay MacDonald and Sidney Webb, Henderson in 1918 established a national network of constituency organisations. They operated separately from trade unions and the National Executive Committee and were open to everyone sympathetic to the party's policies. Secondly, Henderson secured the adoption of a comprehensive statement of party policies, as drafted by Sidney Webb. Entitled "Labour and the New Social Order," it remained the basic Labour platform until 1950. It proclaimed a socialist party whose principles included a guaranteed minimum standard of living for everyone, nationalisation of industry, and heavy taxation of large incomes and of wealth.

 The "Coupon Election" and the 1920s 
Henderson lost his seat in the "Coupon Election" of 14 December 1918, which had been announced within twenty-four hours of the end of hostilities and which resulted in a landslide victory for a coalition formed by Lloyd George. Henderson returned to Parliament in 1919 after winning a by-election in Widnes. He then became Labour's Chief Whip.

Vladimir Lenin held Henderson in very low regard. In a letter to the Soviet Commissar for Foreign Affairs, Georgy Chicherin, written on 10 February 1922 and referring to the Genoa Conference, Lenin wrote: "Henderson is as stupid as Kerensky, and for this reason he is helping us."

Henderson lost his seat again, at the general election of 1922. He returned to Parliament via another by-election, this time representing Newcastle East, but again, he was unseated at the general election of 1923. He returned to Parliament just two months later after winning another by-election in Burnley.

In 1924, Henderson was appointed as Home Secretary in the first-ever Labour government, led by MacDonald. This government was defeated later the same year and lost the general election that followed.

Having been re-elected in 1924, Henderson refused to challenge MacDonald for the party leadership. Worried about factionalism in the Labour Party, he published a pamphlet, Labour and the Nation, in which he attempted to clarify the party's goals.

 Foreign Secretary 
In 1929, Labour formed another minority government and MacDonald appointed Henderson as Foreign Secretary, a position Henderson used to try to reduce the tensions that had been building up in Europe since the end of the First World War. Diplomatic relations were re-established with the USSR and Henderson guaranteed Britain's full support to the League of Nations.

 The MacDonald "betrayal" 
The Great Depression plunged the government into a terminal crisis. The Cabinet agreed that it was essential to maintain the Gold Standard and that the Budget needed to be balanced, but were divided over reducing unemployment benefits by 10%. At first, Henderson gave strong support to Prime Minister MacDonald throughout the financial and political crisis of August. The financial crisis across Europe was worsening and Britain's gold reserves were at high risk. New York banks provided an emergency loan; but additional money was needed and to get it, the budget had to be balanced. MacDonald and Chancellor of the Exchequer Philip Snowden proposed cuts in unemployment benefits. Henderson rejected that solution and became the leader of nearly half the Cabinet. The Labour Cabinet decided to resign. King George V implored MacDonald to remain and form an all-party National Government that would make the budget cuts. MacDonald agreed on 24 August 1931 and formed an emergency National Government, with members from all parties. The new cabinet had four Labourites (now called the "National Labour Organisation") who stood with Macdonald, plus four Conservatives and two Liberals.   Labour unions were strongly opposed and the Labour Party officially repudiated the new National government. It expelled MacDonald and his supporters from the party. Henderson cast the only vote against the expulsions. Against his inclinations, Henderson accepted the leadership of the main Labour Party and led it into the general election on 27 October against the cross-party National coalition.  It was a disastrous result for Labour, which was reduced to a small minority of 52.  MacDonald won the largest landslide in British electoral history.  Yet again Henderson lost his seat, at Burnley.  The following year, he relinquished the party leadership.

 Later career 

Henderson returned to Parliament after winning a by-election at Clay Cross, achieving the unique feat of being elected a total of five times at by-elections in constituencies where he had not previously been the MP. He holds the record for the greatest number of comebacks from losing a previous seat.

Henderson spent the rest of his life trying to halt the gathering storm of World War II. He worked with the World League of Peace and chaired the Geneva Disarmament Conference, and in 1934 he was awarded the Nobel Peace Prize. (On 3 April 2013 his Nobel medal was stolen from the official residence of the Lord Mayor of Newcastle.)
 
Henderson died in 1935, aged 72, and was cremated at Golders Green Crematorium. All three of Henderson's sons saw military service during the Great War, the eldest, David, being killed in action in 1916 whilst serving as a Captain with the Middlesex Regiment (Duke of Cambridge's Own). His surviving sons also became Labour politicians: second son William was granted the title of Baron Henderson in 1945, while his third son, Arthur, was created Baron Rowley in 1966.

The Labour History Archive and Study Centre at the People's History Museum in Manchester holds the papers of Arthur Henderson in their collection, spanning from 1915 to 1935.

Works
 The League of Nations and labour (1918)

See also
 List of peace activists

 Citations 

Sources

 Hamilton, Mary Agnes. Arthur Henderson: A Biography (1938), a detailed and favourable account by a former colleague
 Howard, Christopher. "MacDonald, Henderson, and the Outbreak of War, 1914." Historical Journal 20.4 (1977): 871–891. online
 McKibbin, Ross. "Arthur Henderson as Labour Leader," International Review of Social History (1978) pp. 79–101
 Riddell, Neil. "Arthur Henderson, 1931–1932," in Leading Labour: From Keir Hardie to Tony Blair, ed. Kevin Jefferys (1999)
 Thorpe, Andrew. "Arthur Henderson and the British Political Crisis of 1931," Historical Journal (1988) pp. 117–139 in JSTOR
 UK National Archives, online
 Winkler, Henry H. "Arthur Henderson," in The Diplomats, 1919–1939, ed. Gordon A. Craig and Felix Gilbert (1953)
 Winter, J M. "Arthur Henderson, the Russian Revolution and the Reconstruction of the Labour Party," Historical Journal (1972) pp. 753–73. in JSTOR
 Wrigley, Chris. Arthur Henderson (1990), a scholarly biography

 External links 

 
  including the Nobel Lecture, 11 December 1934 Essential Elements of a Universal and Enduring Peace''
 J. Keir Hardie and Arthur Henderson, Manifesto to the British People  (1 August 1914)
 Parliamentary Archives, Papers of Arthur Henderson MP on the Disarmament Conference in Geneva, 1932
 

 

British Secretaries of State for Education
British Secretaries of State for Foreign Affairs
Secretaries of State for the Home Department
Members of the Privy Council of the United Kingdom
Leaders of the Labour Party (UK)
Labour Party (UK) MPs for English constituencies
United Kingdom Paymasters General
UK MPs 1900–1906
UK MPs 1906–1910
UK MPs 1910
UK MPs 1910–1918
UK MPs 1918–1922
UK MPs 1922–1923
UK MPs 1923–1924
UK MPs 1924–1929
UK MPs 1929–1931
UK MPs 1931–1935
Nobel Peace Prize laureates
British Nobel laureates
British Methodists
Converts to Methodism
Politicians from Glasgow
Moldmakers
1863 births
1935 deaths
Members of the Executive of the Labour and Socialist International
Politics of Burnley
Scottish Nobel laureates
People from Anderston
Chairs of the Labour Party (UK)
People from Widnes